Ming Fay is a Shanghai-born and New York City-based sculptor and professor. His work focuses on the concept of the garden as a symbol of utopia and the relationship between man and nature. Drawing upon an extensive knowledge of plants both Eastern and Western, real and mythical, Fay creates his own calligraphic floating forest of reeds, branches and surreal species.  He is most well known for his sculpture and large scale installations and he currently teaches sculpture at William Paterson University in Wayne, New Jersey.

Early life and education
Ming Fay was born in Shanghai in 1943 and late moved to Hong Kong in 1952, soon after the rise of communism in mainland China. His mother was an artist, and his father worked in the then-burgeoning Hong Kong movie industry as an art director. Both were students of Shanghai-based sculptor Zhang Chongren, who had studied Western sculpture in Europe.  Ming came to the United States in 1961 to study at the Columbus College of Art and Design and later at the Kansas City Institute of Art. Subsequently, Fay earned a graduate degree in sculpture at the University of California, Santa Barbara in 1975.

Artistic career
Ming Fay has exhibited internationally in numerous solo exhibitions, and his work has frequented important group shows throughout the world. He was also a founding member of an art collective called, Epoxy Art Group in the 1980s, which included other Chinese American artists. Exhibitions have taken place at the Whitney Museum of American Art at Phillip Morris (New York, NY), the National Academy Museum (New York, NY), Museum of Contemporary Art in Shanghai, Łódź Biennale at The International Artists' Museum (Łódź, Poland), Butters Gallery (Portland, Oregon), Ramapo Gallery (Ramapo, New Jersey), and the Hong Kong Museum of Art. Fay has also completed numerous public art commissions including a suspended glass and steel sculpture for a residential lobby in Philadelphia, a large scale tree sculpture in Puerto Rico, sculptural benches for New York City's Staten Island Ferry Whitehall Terminal, and glass mosaic murals for the Delancey Street – Essex Street New York City Subway station.
He is also the recipient of the 2007 NYFA fellowship in Sculpture.

Public Art Commissions
2009 Chicago Public Art Program, O'Hare International Airport Terminal 2, Chicago
2005 Whitehall Crossing, Whitehall Ferry Terminal, Staten Island Ferry, Cultural Affairs Department, New York
2004 Goldilocks, Tivoli Building, Redevelopment Authority, Philadelphia
2004 Pillar Arc, Federal Courthouse, General Services Administration, Seattle
2004 Delancey Orchard and Shad Crossing, Delancey / Essex Subway Station, Metropolitan Transit Authority, New York
2003 Arbol Magico, Lluberas Park, Department of Transportation and Public Works, Yauco, Puerto Rico
2002 Ginkoberry Gwa, Oregon Convention Center, Portland
1999 Lippman Arcade Project, NYC Economic Development Corporation, Queens
1998 Staten Island Ferry Terminal Project, Cultural Affairs Department, New York
1997 Public Art Fund Project, Phipps Housing, The Bronx, New York
1995 Spiral Ears, Philadelphia Criminal Justice Center, Philadelphia
1990 Leaf Gate, Keys Flight, Seed of Elm, The Spirit of the Elm, Elm in Bloom, Sprouting Buds, P.S. 7,  Elmhurst, NYC Department of Cultural Affairs, Queens, NY

Collections
M+ Museum, Hong Kong, CN
China Club, Hong Kong, CN
Conrad Hilton Hotel, Hong Kong, CN
Daum Museum of Contemporary Art, Sedalia, MO
Taipei Fine Art Museum, Taipei, TaIwan
Hong Kong Museum of Art, Hong Kong, CN
Howard Plaza Hotel, Taipei, Taiwan
Columbus College of Art and Design, Columbus, OH
Columbus Gallery of Fine Art, Columbus, OH
Del Mar College, Corpus Christi, TX
John Michael Kohler Arts Center, Sheboygan, WI
Sidney Lewis Foundation, Richmond, VA
Mobil Oil Corporation, New York, NY
J.P. Morgan, Hong Kong, CN
Otis Art Institute, Los Angeles, CA
Prudential Insurance Company, Los Angeles, CA
R.J. Reynolds Corporation, Salem, NC
Rhode Island School of Design, Providence, RI
Ten Main Center, Kansas City, MO
Zimmerli Art Museum, Rutgers University, New Brunswick, NJ

Achievements
2000–present Artist-in-Residence, Rinehart School of Sculpture, Master of Fine Arts Program, Maryland Institute College of Art, Baltimore, MD
2008 Sculpture Award, National Academy of Art, New York, NY
2007 Fellowship in Sculpture, New York Foundation for the Arts, New York, NY
2004  National Endowment for the Arts Grant, Commission Proposal Support
1995 Arts/ Industry Residency Program, John Michael Kohler Arts Center, Kohler, WI
1994 MidAtlantic Arts Foundation Grant, Residency Program, Brodksy Center for Innovative Editions, Rutgers University, New Brunswick, NJ
1994 Residency Program, UrbanGlass: New York Center for Contemporary Glass, Brooklyn, NY
1992 Arts Partners Program, Lila Wallace - Reader's Digest Fund, New York, NY

References

External links
Selected works on Art Asian America
Selected works from Lesley Heller Gallery

William Paterson University faculty
Living people
1943 births
Artists from Shanghai
Hong Kong artists
University of California, Santa Barbara alumni
Columbus College of Art and Design alumni
Chinese Civil War refugees